John Robert Ringrose (born 21 December  1932) is an English mathematician working on operator algebras who introduced nest algebras. He was elected a Fellow of the Royal Society in 1977. In 1962, Ringrose won the Adams Prize.

Works
 with Richard V. Kadison: Fundamentals of the theory of operator algebras, 4 vols., Academic Press 1983, 1986, 1991, 1992 (2nd edn. American Mathematical Society 1997)
 Compact non self-adjoint operators, van Nostrand 1971

References

English mathematicians
Fellows of the Royal Society
1932 births
Living people